Jamnagar & Dwaraka Railway was a  metre gauge  in the Nawanagar State in Gujarat during 19th century.

History 
After the death of Vibhoji Ranmalji in 1895 Jashwantsinhji Vibhoji who came on to throne on 28 April 1895 started the first section of what came to be called the Jamnagar Railway. The railway line from Jamnagar (then called Nawanagar) to Rajkot was opened for traffic in 1897 with Bhavnagar-Gondal-Junagad-Porbandar railway line. Ranjitsinhji Vibhoji who was the ruler of Nawanagar State worked with Bhavnagar-Gondal-Junagad-Porbandar Railway system until 1911. Later he worked with Dwarka Railway. As the line was extended westwards towards Dwarka and Okha Port on the Gulf of Kutch. Hence the system was renamed as Jamnagar & Dwarka Railway. Later during the regime of Digvijaysinhji Ranjitsinhji, the Jamnagar & Dwaraka Railway was merged into Saurashtra Railway in April 1948.

Rolling stock 
In 1936, the company owned 17 locomotives, 3 railcars, 75 coaches and 607 goods wagons.

Classification
It was labeled as a Class II railway according to Indian Railway Classification System of 1926.

Conversion to broad gauge
The railway lines were converted to  broad gauge in 1984.

References

Metre gauge railways in India
Defunct railway companies of India
History of rail transport in Gujarat
Jamnagar district
Transport in Jamnagar